Gerald Cross (20 February 1912 – 26 February 1981) was an English actor. Among his credits are Doctor Who, Francis Durbridge's The World of Tim Frazer and the Miss Marple films Murder, She Said (1961) and Murder Ahoy! (1964).

Cross played the part of Arnold Tripp, the editor of the local newspaper, in the early BBC Television soap opera The Newcomers.

He died in Camden Town.

Filmography

References

External links
 

1912 births
1981 deaths
People from Camden Town
English male television actors
20th-century English male actors